Elizabeth Reeve Cutter Morrow (May 29, 1873 – January 24, 1955) was an American poet, champion of women's education, and influence on Mexican culture. She wrote several children's books and collections of poetry. She and her husband, ambassador Dwight Morrow, collected wide variety of art while in Mexico and helped popularize Mexican folk art.

Early life 
Elizabeth Reeve Cutter, called Betty, was born in Cleveland, Ohio, to Charles Cutter and Annie Spencer Cutter. Besides her twin Mary, Betty had three younger sisters. The Cutters lived in Cleveland with their extended family before moving in 1888 to a home Charles built nearby. Annie Cutter raised her children to be pious and respect etiquette, and the Bible was a regular study tool in the Cutter's home. Betty learned to love reading and writing from the Hebrew Bible and the New Testament.

Both Mary and Betty were sickly children, and, in 1879, both sisters became ill enough the family decided to move from their home in Cleveland to New Orleans, Louisiana. Supposedly, the warm weather was to cure the girls' sickness. The trip South was meant to be temporary, but Mary's declining health kept the family in New Orleans. On November 22, 1882, Mary died from tuberculosis. After Mary died, Mrs. Cutter became overprotective about Betty's health. In March 1883 Betty was sent to her Uncle John, a doctor in Dayton, Ohio. Betty disliked her trips to Dayton and began a lifelong habit of writing in a diary to cope. Through this exercise, she met her Uncle Arthur who encouraged her love of books and writing. Betty's health returned, and, in 1888, she went to the Republican Convention with her Uncle Charlie. Betty yearned to live like her wealthy uncle, but this dream seemed unattainable as the family lived in near poverty.

Education 
Cutter attended Smith College from 1892 to 1896. The summer before her sophomore year, her father lost his job and was unable to pay for tuition, so her uncle Arthur paid for her remaining years at Smith. In her sophomore year, Dwight Morrow began courting her after they met at a dance.

Life 
After graduating from Smith, Cutter started "parlor-teaching." She gave six talks a week on Henrik Ibsen's plays from the comfort of her cousin's home.

In the summer of 1899, the Cutter family went abroad to Europe and would not return until the spring of 1901. She continued to write letters to Dwight Morrow during this time. They married on June 16, 1903.  The Morrows settled in Englewood, New Jersey. They moved into a small house and over the course of 7 years the family would move two more times into increasingly larger estates until settling in their final home, named Next Day (to-Morrow) Hill.

The Morrows had four children, including Anne Morrow Lindbergh (1906-2001), wife of Charles Lindbergh, and Elisabeth Morrow (1904-1934), founder of The Elisabeth Morrow School. Her youngest children were Dwight Whitney Jr. (1908-1976), and Constance Cutter (1913-1995). Her days were occupied by attending many clubs; she belonged to organizations such as the Community Chest, The Red Cross, The Children's Aid Society, The Presbyterian Church, and The Smith College Club.

Mexico

In 1927 Dwight Morrow was assigned to be the American ambassador to Mexico. At first, she did not like her husband's assignment in Mexico as they had to move from their home in New Jersey and she saw this as a type of exile, but she soon grew to love Mexican culture. She often remarked on the grandeur of the embassy and of the warm welcome they received  In Mexico, the couple built a small house in Cuernavaca they named Casa Mañana. There they gathered a large collection of Mexican folk art and hired a large amount of local artists to create fountains and a mural around the estate.

After leaving Mexico in 1930, the Morrow's collection of art grew in popularity among American audiences, and an exhibition of the art was held. Their large collection of art helped to popularize Mexican folk art.

After her husband died in his sleep in 1931 Morrow would continue to visit Casa Mañana for up to a month every spring. During such trips, she would fund projects to restore the murals she and her husband commissioned. In her later years Betty wrote on her time in Mexico with several books: The Painted Pig, Casa Manana, and The Mexican Years.

In widowhood, she became the first female head of Smith College, acting as college president from 1939 to 1940, but she was never officially granted the title.

Death 
In November 1954, Betty had a stroke, went into a coma, and died on January 24, 1955.

Legacy 
Elizabeth Morrow is remembered for being a philanthropist and an advocate for women's education. In her later years donated her husband's documents to Amherst College, his alma mater, and Betty's documents from her time as acting president at Smith are preserved in their archive.

Selected works 
 The Painted Pig (1930) (Illustrated by Rene D'Harnoncourt)
 Quatrains for My Daughter (1931)
 Casa Mañana (1932) (Illustrated by William Spratling)
 The Rabbit's Nest (1940)
 Shannon (1940) (Illustrated by Helen Torrey)

References

Bibliography

External links
Morrow House A Dormitory at Smith College named in her honor.
Cutter House Another Dormitory at Smith College named in her honor.
Office of the Acting President Elizabeth Morrow files, Smith College Archives, Smith College Special Collections
Elizabeth Morrow personal papers, Smith College Archives, Smith College Special Collections

Smith College alumni
1873 births
1955 deaths
20th-century American women writers
20th-century American poets
American women poets
Presidents of Smith College
Women heads of universities and colleges